
Darrington may refer to:

Places
Darrington, West Yorkshire, England
Darrington, Washington, United States

People with the surname
Denton Darrington (born 1940), American politician
Michael Darrington, British businessman
Mike Darrington (born 1931), English snooker player

People with the given name
Darrington Sentimore (born 1990), American football player

See also
Darrington Unit, a prison in Texas, United States